Boris Nikolaevich Svetlov was a Russian film director and actor who worked in the Azerbaijani cinema in the mid to late 1910s and Lenfilm Studio in 1919–1926.

He directed the 1917 film The Cloth Peddler.

Filmography
The Cloth Peddler (1917) - full-length silent comedy
 (1916) - full-length feature film
Arvadlar Ərlərini Mənsəbə Necə Çatdırırlar (1916) - full-length feature film
Barefoot Love (1916) - short feature film
Prince Demir Bulat (1916) (Tammetrajlı Bədii Film)
In the Kingdom of Oil and Millions (1916) - full-length feature film
An Hour Before Death (1916) - full-length feature film
A New-Style Old Story (1916) - short feature film
The Story of One Humiliation (1919) - full-length feature film
Bortsy Za Svetloye Tsarstvo Tretyego Internatsionala (FIGHTERS FOR THE BRIGHT KINGDOM OF THE THIRD INTERNATIONAL) (1919) - propaganda film
Vse Pod Ruzhyo (ALL TO ARMS) (1919) - propaganda film
Pobeda Maya (MAY VICTORY) (1919) - propaganda film
Proletargrad na Strazhe Revolutsii (PROLETARGRAD ON GUARD OF REVOLUTION) (1919) - propaganda film
Lesniye Bratya (FOREST BROTHERS) (1921) - propaganda film
Dolya ty Russkaya, Dolyushka Zhenskaya (RUSSIAN WOMAN’S LOT) (1922) - full-length feature film
Career of Spirka Shpandyr (1926) - full-length feature film
Chuzhiye (ALIENS) (1926) - full-length feature film

External links

 Lenfilm: PREFACE TO THE CATALOGUE

Russian film directors
Azerbaijani film directors
Russian male actors
Year of birth missing
Year of death missing